Ring Van Möbius is a Norwegian rock band currently based in Kopervik, Norway.

The band styles itself as "Retro Prog", evoking the sounds of bands like ELP, Van Der Graaf Generator and Jethro Tull from the 1970s.

History 
Ring Van Möbius was formed in 2017.

The band started playing live in 2018 and have released two full LP's on Apollon Records to date, garnering significant international press.

Members

Current members 
Thor Erik Helgesen : Vocals, Hammond L100, Spectral Modular Synthesis System, Fender Rhodes, Clavinet D6, piano, Moog Satellite, Korg MS20
Håvard Rasmussen : Fender Bass VI, Moog Theremin, Ring Modulator and Space Echo effects
Dag Olav Husås : Glockenspiel, chimes, timpani, gong, tubular bells, cymbals, drums and backing vocals

Discography

Albums 
 Past the Evening Sun - 2018
 The 3rd Majesty - 2020

References 

Norwegian rock music groups